Kamar Zard or Kamar-e Zard may refer to:
 Kamar Zard, Bushehr
 Kamar Zard, Fars
 Kamar Zard, Kermanshah
 Kamar Zard, Razavi Khorasan